Mountain View High School is a public high school in Mountain View, Wyoming, United States. It is part of Uinta County School District #4 and serves students in grades nine through twelve. The school's mascot is the Buffalo and their chief athletic rivals are the Lyman Eagles.

Mountain View High School serves the town of Mountain View and the Census-designated places of Carter, Fort Bridger, Lonetree, Robertson, and Urie.

References 

Public high schools in Wyoming
Schools in Uinta County, Wyoming